Fourplay is the second studio album recorded by American male vocal quartet Double Exposure, released in 1978 on the Salsoul label.

History
The album features the song "Newsy Neighbors", which failed to chart. One other single, "Perfect Lover", was released. It also failed to chart.

Track listing

Personnel
Leonard "Butch" Davis, Charles Whittington, Joseph Harris, James Williams – vocals
Keith Benson, Scotty Miller – drums
Jimmy Williams, Raymond Earl – bass
Ron Kersey, Cotton Kent, Bruce Hawes, Bunny Sigler, Dennis Richardson, Bruce Gray – keyboards
Norman Harris, Bobby Eli, T.J. Tindall, Edward Moore – guitars
Larry Washington, James Walker – congas 
Ron Tyson – percussion
Bunny Harris – tambourine
The Don Renaldo Strings and Horns – strings, horns
Evette Benton, Carla Benson, Barbara Ingram – background vocals

Production
Norman Harris, Ron Tyson, Bunny Sigler, Ron Kersey, Bruce Hawes – producers
Joe Cayre, Stan Cayre, Ken Cayre – executive producers
Carl Paruolo, Dirk Devlin, Kenny Present, Rocky Schnaars – engineers
Jeff Stewart, Jay Mark – technicians
José Rodriguez – mastering
Stanley Hochstadt – art direction
Michael Nelson – photography
Lloyd Gelassen – graphic supervision

References

External links
 

1978 albums
Double Exposure (band) albums
Albums produced by Norman Harris
Albums recorded at Sigma Sound Studios
Salsoul Records albums